Aviation Career Exploring, whose participants are called "Explorers," is one of the career-oriented programs offered by Learning for Life, a branch of the Boy Scouts of America.

History
Air Scouts is a now-defunct program of the Boy Scouts of America (BSA). The Air Scouts program had four ranks Apprentice, Observer, Craftsman, and Ace (later under the Explorer program the ranks were Apprentice, Bronze, Gold, and Silver Award). The Ace (Silver Award) cloth knot and medal may still be worn by anyone who earned them before the program was dropped.

The program was established in 1941 and existed under the name Air Scouts until 1949, when it was renamed Air Explorers. With minor changes, this program lasted until 1965, when it was fully merged into the then existing Explorer program of the BSA as a specialty called "Aviation Career Exploring."

On 1 March 1985, the Boy Scouts of America officially ended powered aircraft flight in its Aviation Exploring program, citing difficulties with maintaining insurance coverage in the event of an aircraft accident. 450 Explorer Posts and over 10,000 Explorer Scouts were affected.

Activities
Members attend meetings twice a month. Activities during meetings may include:
 taking orientation flights in military transports, helicopters, gliders, or single-engine general aviation aircraft
 taking trips to Air Force bases, aviation museums, air shows, or FAA facilities.
 learning to pre-flight an aircraft
 taking pilot training ground school classes

Activities may be geared towards providing information for many common aviation careers, including:
 Pilots
 Aircraft mechanics
 Aerospace engineers
 Airport management and operations
 Unmanned aerial vehicle operators
 Avionics technicians
 Air traffic controllers
 Flight attendants

Membership
The program is open to youth aged 14–20.

See also
 Civil Air Patrol
 Fire Service Exploring
 Health Career Exploring
 Law Enforcement Exploring

References

External links
Explore the Depth Of Sky
Find An Explorer Post

Air Cadet organisations
Boy Scouts of America